Taymi Chappé Valladares (11 September 1968 – 3 November 2020) was a Cuban-Spanish fencer. She competed in the women's individual épée event at the 1996 Summer Olympics. She won gold in women's épée at the 1990 World Championships under the Cuban flag. For Spain, she won a team gold at the 1994 World Championships and a bronze medal at the 1997 World Fencing Championships.

Chappé died on 3 November 2020, aged 52.

References

External links
 

1968 births
2020 deaths
Cuban female épée fencers
Spanish female épée fencers
Olympic fencers of Spain
Fencers at the 1996 Summer Olympics
Sportspeople from Havana
Pan American Games medalists in fencing
Pan American Games gold medalists for Cuba
Pan American Games silver medalists for Cuba
Universiade medalists in fencing
Fencers at the 1991 Pan American Games
Universiade silver medalists for Cuba
Medalists at the 1989 Summer Universiade
20th-century Cuban women
20th-century Cuban people
21st-century Cuban women